The 2021–22 Moldovan Women's Cup was the 25th season of the Moldovan annual football tournament. The competition started on 13 October 2021 and concluded with the final held on 4 June 2022. A total of seven teams had their entries to the tournament.

Group stage

Group A

Group B

Semi-finals

|}

Matches

Final

The final was played on Saturday 4 June 2022 at the Nisporeni Stadium in Nisporeni.

References

Moldovan Women's Cup seasons
Moldovan Women's Cup 2021-22
Moldova